The Iittala railway station is located in the town of Hämeenlinna (formerly the municipality of Kalvola), Finland, in the urban area and former municipal seat of Iittala. It is located along the Riihimäki–Tampere railway, and its neighboring stations are Toijala in the north and Parola in the south.

Services 

Iittala is served by VR commuter rail line  on the route Helsinki–Riihimäki–Hämeenlinna–Tampere. Southbound trains toward Hämeenlinna, Riihimäki and Helsinki use track 1, while northbound trains toward Tampere use track 2.

References 

Hämeenlinna
Railway stations in Kanta-Häme